Villafranca de la Sierra is a municipality located in the province of Ávila, Castile and León, Spain. According to the 2004 census (INE), the municipality has a population of 176 inhabitants.

Monuments

Our Lady of the Assumption Parish Church
Our Lady of the Assumption Parish Church is from the fifteenth century, made of hewn stone, with a single storey nave belfry tower. It sits on an earlier Romanesque temple. The oldest part, possibly from the fourteenth century, is the chapel which is closed in a semicircle. The altarpiece is dated 1690. The apse is circular, with two lateral entrances, rebuilt in 1600. Its single nave has three semicircular arches with rich moldings, with balls in their chapiters, and rather complicated bases. Perhaps the nave did not rest on them, but on armor skirts, but what is visible today are plaster vaults. The main arch is likewise round, rebuilt in the sixteenth century. But the chapel is perhaps older than the nave, closed in a semicircle.

References

Municipalities in the Province of Ávila